Cornelius S S Bello  was an Anglican bishop in Nigeria: he was the Bishop of Zaria, one of ten dioceses within the Anglican Province of Kaduna, itself one of 14 provinces within the Church of Nigeria.

He was Bishop of Zaria until 2017 when he retired and was replaced by Abiodun Ogunyemi.

Notes

Living people
Anglican bishops of Zaria
21st-century Anglican bishops in Nigeria
Year of birth missing (living people)